The 11th Guam Legislature was a meeting of the Guam Legislature. It convened in Hagatna, Guam on January 4, 1971 and ended on January 1, 1973, during the 1st and 2nd years of Carlos Camacho's elected Gubernatorial Term.

In the 1970 Guamanian general election, the Democratic Party of Guam won a fifteen-to-six (15-6) supermajority of seats in the Guam Legislature.

Party Summary

Membership

References 

Politics of Guam
Political organizations based in Guam
Legislature of Guam